Havens Head Retail Park is a retail park located in Milford Haven, Wales.   

Opened in 1998, it is situated centrally between Milford town and Hakin in Hubberston Pill, adjacent to the railway station. It occupies a previously industrial area, the site of a former Jewson branch.  There are nine individual business units, offering  of retail space.  A car park of 369 spaces is attached.

Its arrival was heralded as an opportunity for Milford Haven to acquire a higher retail profile in Pembrokeshire.  The park has attracted a certain amount of controversy, with claims that it has weakened the traditional retail focus on Charles Street and the traditional centre of town.

References

External links
 Property Magazine International Metric Property Investments acquires Havens Head Retail Park for 14,4m

Buildings and structures in Milford Haven
Shopping centres in Wales